Ángel Atienza Landeta (16 March 1931 – 23 August 2015 in Madrid) was a Spanish artist and retired footballer who played as a defender for Real Madrid, with whom he won the inaugural European Cup.

Football career
Atienza was born in the Spanish capital of Madrid and retired from professional football on 1 July 1960. Over the course of his career, he played for Real Zaragoza and Real Madrid, winning La Liga and the European Cup thrice each for the latter. Already interested in art, he worked as an artist in the period between playing for Zaragoza and Madrid.

Art career 
During his football career, Atienza participated in group exhibitions and maintained ties with the artistic world in his spare time. In 1958, during a journey in Central Europe, he discovered coloured glass fitted in concrete as an artistic expression. Subsequently, he started to collaborate with other artists, retired from football, and began making mosaic murals and stained glass pieces. In 1964, he started to create ceramic murals. His first work was at the Carlton Rioja Hotel in Logroño. He moved to Venezuela in 1976 and began incorporating new materials in his mural work, such as iron, bronze, and aluminium. He participated directly in various architectural projects in order to obtain harmony between his works and their surroundings. In 2001, he returned to Spain, where he continues to work on paintings and participates in exhibitions and showrooms.

Personal life
His older brother Adolfo Atienza was also a footballer, who played as a forward for Celta de Vigo, Real Madrid, Las Palmas, Real Jaén, and the Spanish national team. They played together for Madrid during the 1954-55 season.

Honours and awards

Football
 3 La Liga: 1954-55, 1956-57, 1957-58
 3 European Cup: 1956, 1957, 1958

Art
Savings Bank of Málaga national prize (Málaga)
Honorary plaque of San Juan Bosco Church (Los Teques, Venezuela)
Juan Fernandez of Leon Distinction (Guanare, Venezuela)

Exhibitions
1964: Daily Town, exhibitions room (Madrid)
1972: Rottembourg Art Gallery (Madrid)
1972: Hilton Hotel, exhibitions room (Brussels)
1973: Lambert Monet Art Gallery (Geneva)
1975: Rottembourg Art Gallery, group exhibition (Madrid)
1975: La Coruña, exhibition room (Spain)
2003: Sala Barna Art Gallery (Barcelona)
2003: MAC 21 International Contemporary Art Fair (Marbella, Spain)
2003: Frankfurter Buchmesse Art Fair (Frankfurt)
2004: Sala Sorolla Art Gallery (Terrassa)
2004: Sala Barna Art Gallery, group exhibitions (Barcelona)
2004: Frankfurter Buchmesse Art Fair Art Fair (Frankfurt)
2004: Museum of the Americas (Miami)
2005/2006: Torreón Fortea, exhibition room (Zaragoza)
2006: Sala Barna Art Gallery (Barcelona)
2006: Holland Art Fair (The Hague)
2007: Sala Barna Art Gallery (Barcelona)
2008: Sala Esart Art Gallery, Winter Showroom (Barcelona)
2008: Sala Pia Almoina Art Gallery (Barcelona)

See also
Ernie Barnes, an American football player who became an artist after retiring

References

External links
Official website
Curriculum vitae
@angel_atienza (Instagram)

1931 births
Association football defenders
2015 deaths
Artists from the Community of Madrid
Footballers from the Community of Madrid
Real Madrid CF players
Real Zaragoza players
Venezuelan artists
Spanish footballers
UEFA Champions League winning players